Big Man is a 2014 South Korean television series starring Kang Ji-hwan, Choi Daniel, Lee Da-hee, and Jung So-min. It aired on KBS2 from April 28 to June 17, 2014, for 16 episodes.

Plot
Kim Ji-hyuk grew up a penniless orphan and lived a "third-rate life" before deciding to turn himself around and work himself to the bone, with humble dreams of owning his own restaurant. He gets entangled in a plan to save the life of Kang Dong-seok, a chaebol heir who needs a heart transplant, and is told that he is Dong-seok's older brother and begins a lavish new life in that world... and then later learns that it was all a lie. Disgusted with the corruption of his chaebol "family" and spurred on by hatred of the world's unfair realities, Ji-hyuk embarks on a reckless revenge mission in order to protect himself and those he loves.

Cast

Main characters
 Kang Ji-hwan as Kim Ji-hyuk
 Lee Tae-woo as young Ji-hyuk
He is born a penniless orphan and grows up to be an uneducated, poor, "trash-like" man. His life changes when he is tricked into believing that he is the long-lost eldest son of a rich, chaebol family, but everything he's told turns out to be lies. Actually Ji-hyuk is not related to them at all, and the family only wanted to circumvent the transplant program and make him the heart donor for his supposed brother Kang Dong-seok, the real heir.
 Choi Daniel as Kang Dong-seok
 Nam Da-reum as young Dong-seok
Outwardly friendly and congenial, Dong-seok is a two-faced and cunning businessman who doesn't hesitate to do whatever it takes to survive in business. As the only son and heir to the Hyunsung Group, he readily accepts his future as leader of Korea's most powerful business conglomerate. However, his ascent to power is complicated by a business rival, Kim Ji-hyuk.
 Lee Da-hee as So Mi-ra
The daughter of the chauffeur of Hyunsung Group, and manager of the in-house staff. She gets involved in an effort to save Dong-seok's life, who loves her despite the difference in their social class. But Mi-ra eventually falls for Ji-hyuk, and winds up secretly aiding him on his mission.
 Jung So-min as Kang Jin-ah
Dong-seok's younger sister. A badly behaved, self-centered heiress, Jin-ah is used to getting her own way, until she falls in unrequited love with Ji-hyuk.

Supporting characters
 Song Ok-sook as Hong Dal-sook
 Jang Tae-sung as Yang Dae-sub
 Kwon Hae-hyo as Gu Deok-gyu
 Kim Ji-hoon as Choi Yoo-jae
 Lee Dae-yeon as Kim Han-doo
 Jang Hang-sun as Jo Hwa-soo
 Kim Dae-ryung as Jo Beom-shik
 Yoon So-hee as So Hye-ra
 Kim Mi-kyung as Ahn Bong-rim
 Um Hyo-sup as Kang Sung-wook
 Cha Hwa-yeon as Choi Yoon-jung
 Han Sang-jin as Do Sang-ho
 Lee Hae-woo as Moon Myung-ho
 Na Seung-ho as Assistant Manager Lee
 Choi Jung-hwa as journalist
 Lee Sung-min as high-ranking executive (cameo)
 Park Won-sang as homicide detective (cameo)
 Song Jae-rim as Park Dong-pal (cameo)
 Oh Sang-jin as news anchor
 Jung Myung-joon as lawyer
 Kim Min-jae as Prosecutor Yong
 Jung Dong-gyu as judge
 Kim Seung-wook

Ratings

Awards and nominations

International broadcast

References

External links
  
 
 
 

2014 South Korean television series debuts
2014 South Korean television series endings
Korean Broadcasting System television dramas
Korean-language television shows
South Korean melodrama television series
South Korean suspense television series
Television series by Kim Jong-hak Production
Television series by KBS Media